Tovomitopsis is a genus of flowering plant in the family Clusiaceae.

Some species have been synonymized to the genus Chrysochlamys.

Species
 Tovomitopsis allenii
 Tovomitopsis angustifolia
 Tovomitopsis centistaminibus
 Tovomitopsis colombiana
 Tovomitopsis costaricana
 Tovomitopsis croatii
 Tovomitopsis faucis
 Tovomitopsis glauca
 Tovomitopsis guatemaltecana
 Tovomitopsis macrophylla
 Tovomitopsis membranacea
 Tovomitopsis membrillensis
 Tovomitopsis micrantha
 Tovomitopsis multiflora
 Tovomitopsis myrcioides
 Tovomitopsis nicaraguensis
 Tovomitopsis paniculata
 Tovomitopsis psychotriaefolia
 Tovomitopsis psychotriifolia
 Tovomitopsis saldanhae
 Tovomitopsis silvicola
 Tovomitopsis spruceana
 Tovomitopsis standleyana

References

 
Malpighiales genera